The Sentosa Ferry Terminal, was a cruise terminal located on the island of Sentosa, Singapore. The cruise center was the first of its kind in the region. Built by the Sentosa Development Corporation in 1972, the terminal was the first of nine planned structures to be built on Sentosa. The terminal can cater maritime traffic to various parts of Indonesia, Batam, Karimun Jawa, Tanjungbalai, Penang and Malacca. The terminal building was completed in 1987, with the now-defunct Ferry Terminal Monorail Station located within the building. After the station closed in March 2005, the station interior was kept intact, and the old monorail tracks were covered up and left forgotten. With the then-future Resorts World Sentosa about to occupy the site in 2007, the structure was subsequently demolished to make way for its new occupant.

History
Due to lack of facilities at the now defunct Clifford Pier, the government plans to build a cruise center on an offshore island. Sentosa was picked as it will become a tourist destination and will be large enough to cater to the needs of people. Since the terminal's opening in the early 1970s, at least 9 million passengers pass through its operations. However, many believed that passenger traffic declined in the mid-1990s when a small causeway was built to connect the island to mainland Singapore. The Ferry Terminal Monorail Station once served visitors to the western half of the island, but that service has ceased after the Sentosa Monorail was closed down in 2005. By the start of the early 2000s, it had become clear to locals and foreigners that with the decline of passenger traffic, the ferry terminal was losing its purpose.

Demolition
The Ferry Terminal which was alongside the famous Sentosa Musical Fountain and Fountain Gardens, were demolished on 26 March 2007. The demolishing ceremony  was witnessed by prime minister Lee Hsien Loong, the media, and people from all walks of life. Today, Resorts World Sentosa stands on the demolished section of Imbiah Lookout, with the Crane Dance performance now standing close to where the ferry terminal once stood.

Replacement
After the demolition of the ferry terminal the government later built another cruise center, the Marina South Pier. It was eventually replaced by the International Cruise Terminal in the second quarter of 2012.

See also

Imbiah Lookout — entertainment zone.

References

Demolished buildings and structures in Singapore
Ferry terminals in Singapore
Sentosa
1970s establishments in Singapore
Transport infrastructure completed in 1973
Buildings and structures demolished in 2007
2007 disestablishments in Singapore
20th-century architecture in Singapore